Zavatskaya is a surname, the feminine form of Zavatsky. Notable people with the surname include:

 Yana Zavatskaya (born 1970), Soviet Russian prose writer and translator

Surnames of Russian origin